This is an episode list for the 1951 American television crime drama series Dragnet. The series pilot premiered on NBC on December 16, 1951. A total of 276 episodes aired between December 14, 1951 and August 23, 1959.
Dragnet was on both radio and television from December 1951 through February 1957.
When the first Dragnet movie came out in September 1954, it was available on radio, TV and in the theatres for a while. Jack Webb directed all the episodes; James E. Moser, John Robinson and Frank Burt wrote the majority of the screenplays during the 8 season run of the show.
Series star Jack Webb also wrote a handful of episodes, as did co-star Ben Alexander.  

Barton Yarborough portrayed partner Sgt. Ben Romero in episodes 1 & 2.  In episode 3, although announced as Sgt. Friday's partner, Romero does not appear, and Friday works with Sgt. Bill Cummings (portrayed by Ken Peters).  After Yarborough's death on December 19, 1951, Friday's partner became Sgt. Ed Jacobs, portrayed by Barney Phillips, effective from episode #4 until the end of season one.  For season two, Kenneth Patterson portrayed Officer Bill Lockwood in episode #15, after which Herb Ellis took the role of Officer Frank Smith.  Ellis was replaced by Ben Alexander after five episodes, but because the shows didn't air in production order, Alexander's debut was episode #20, and Ellis' final appearance as Smith was episode #21.  Alexander continued as Smith until the program's cancellation in 1959.

Series overview

Episodes

Season 1 (1951–52)

Season 2 (1952–53)

Season 3 (1953–54)
Friday's partner throughout this season is Officer Frank Smith.

Season 4 (1954–55)
Friday's partner throughout this season is Officer Frank Smith.

Season 5 (1955–56)
Friday's partner throughout this season is Officer Frank Smith.

Season 6 (1956–57)
Friday's partner throughout this season is Officer Frank Smith.

Season 7 (1957–58)
Friday's partner throughout this season is Officer Frank Smith.

Season 8 (1958–59)
Both Friday and Smith receive promotions in the 8th and final season.  Lt. Friday's partner throughout this season is Sgt. Frank Smith.

References

External links
 

1951
Dragnet (1951 series)